Rhode Island is a state located in the Northeastern United States. According to the 2020 United States Census, Rhode Island is the 8th least populous state with  inhabitants and the smallest by land area spanning  of land.
It is divided into 39 municipalities, including 8 cities and 31 towns, grouped into 5 historical counties that have no municipal functions as the state has no county level of government. The entire area of the state is incorporated; all Rhode Island residents live within the borders of a city or town  though some communities within towns and cities are census-designated places.

Municipalities in Rhode Island can incorporate as a town or city by a special act of the state legislature and there is no minimum population requirement. Eight municipalities were re-incorporated as cities operating under a charter, while the other 31 remain as towns which perform similar services. Since Rhode Island has no county level of government, cities and towns provide services commonly performed by county governments in other states. The state's cities and towns may adopt one of four forms of government: council–manager, mayor–council, town council–town meeting, or administrator–council. The primary difference between these forms of government is how the chief executive is selected. The Council–manager system involves an elected council who exercise overall control of the local government and a chief executive termed city or town manager who is generally appointed by and responsible to the council for the administration of local policies. Council–manager systems may elect a mayor but they have no formal administrative functions with the potential exception of a degree of veto power. Mayor–council systems have a similarly elected council however the mayor is elected and yields administrative power. In the town council–town meeting system, there is no full-time chief executive.

The largest municipality by population in Rhode Island is the state capital of Providence, with 190,934 residents. The smallest municipality by population is New Shoreham on Block Island, with 1,410 year-round residents. Rhode Island and Hawaii are the only two states in which all of the municipalities have a population greater than 1,000 people.

Cities and towns

See also

 List of census-designated places in Rhode Island

Notes

References

External links
RI.gov: Complete List of all 39 Cities & Towns in Rhode Island

 01
.
.
Municipalities
Rhode Island
Rhode Island
Rhode Island